The most common religion in Dominica is Christianity, with a majority of practitioners identifying as Roman Catholic. Various minority religious groups are also present on the island.

The constitution of Dominica establishes the freedom of religion, which is broadly respected by both the government and general society.

Demographics 
According to the 2001 population and housing census, approximately 61 percent of Dominica's population is Roman Catholic. Followers of evangelical churches represent 18 percent of the population, Seventh-day Adventists 6 percent, and Methodists 3.7 percent. Minority religious groups and denominations, whose members range from 1.6 percent to 0.2 percent of the population, include Rastafarians, Jehovah's Witnesses, Anglicans, and Muslims. According to the census, 1.4 percent of the population belongs to "other" religious groups, including Baptist, Nazarene, Church of Christ, Brethren Christian, the Bahá’í Faith and Buddhist; 6 percent of the population claims no religious affiliation.

According to the Association of Religion Data Archives, in 2010 the World Christian Database reported that the non-Christian religious groups were spiritualism, followed by 2.6% of the population; Bahai followed by 1.7%; Agnosticism followed by 0.5%; Buddhism, Hinduism, and Islam followed by 0.1% each; and Chinese folk religion, Neoreligions, and Atheism each followed by less than 0.1% of the population.

Religious freedom 
The constitution of Dominica provides for the freedom of religion and thought. This is enforced by the government, although the Rastafarian community objects to the illegal status of cannabis in Dominica, as cannabis plays an important role in their religious practice.

Possession of up to 28grams (1oz) of cannabis was legalized in October 2020. Residents of Dominica may grow up to 3 cannabis plants per household.

The government subsidizes the salaries of teachers at private religious schools. Public schools typically include optional non-denominational prayers in morning assemblies.

Religious groups may register with the government in order to receive non-profit status.

According to the US Department of State, there have been no significant societal breaches of religious freedom in Dominica.

See also
Roman Catholicism in Dominica
Islam in Dominica
Bahá'í Faith in Dominica

References

 
Religion in the British Empire